The North Sea–Baltic Corridor is the number 2 of the ten priority axes of the Trans-European Transport Network (TEN-T).

History
The original corridor of the Core Network to be called Warsaw–Midlands (route Warsaw – Poznań – Frankfurt (Oder) – Berlin – Hannover – Osnabrück – Enschede – Utrecht – Amsterdam/Rotterdam – Felixstowe – Birmingham/Manchester – Liverpool), but following the exit of the United Kingdom from the European Union following Brexit, the axis would no longer reach the British Islands, therefore it was enlarged and redesigned according to the current route from Helsinki to the Benelux.

Description
The North Sea–Baltic Corridor develops its network from the North Sea to the Baltic on the following twelve axes and through the following European cities.

 Helsinki – Tallinn – Riga
 Ventspils – Riga
 Riga – Kaunas
 Klaipeda – Kaunas – Vilnius
 Kaunas – Warszawa
 Warszawa – Poznań – Frankfurt (Oder) – Berlin – Hamburg
 Berlin – Magdeburg – Braunschweig – Hannover
 Hannover – Bremen – Bremerhaven/Wilhelmshaven
 Hannover – Osnabrück – Hengelo – Almelo – Deventer – Utrecht
 Utrecht – Amsterdam
 Utrecht – Rotterdam – Antwerp
 Hannover – Cologne – Antwerp

See also
Rail Baltica

References

External links
 Trans-European Transport Network (TEN-T) at European Union official web site

Transport and the European Union
TEN-T Core Network Corridors